The 2011 NAB AFL Under 18 Championships were the 16th edition of the AFL Under 18 Championships. Eight teams competed in the championships: Vic Metro, Vic Country, South Australia and Western Australia in Division 1, and New South Wales/Australian Capital Territory (NSW/ACT), Northern Territory, Queensland and Tasmania in Division 2. Vic Metro were the Division One champions and Tasmania were the Division Two champions.  The Larke Medal (for the best player in Division 1) was awarded to Western Australia's Stephen Coniglio, and the Hunter Harrison Medal (for the best player in Division 2) was won by Tasmania's John McKenzie.

Format
The format used for the 2011 championships differed slightly from the format used in 2009 and 2010. The two-division format used since 1992 was continued, with each team playing five matches: three against the opponents from their own division, and two from the other division. The cross-divisional matches were played in the first two rounds, and did not count for points or percentage.

Squads

Division One

Division Two

Results

Round 1

Round 2

Round 3

Round 4

Round 5

All-Australian team
The 2011 Under 18 All-Australian team was named on 9 July 2011:

References

Under 18
Australian rules football competition seasons
Australian rules interstate football